The Brazil women's national under-23 volleyball team represents Brazil in international women's volleyball competitions and friendly matches under  the age 23 and it is ruled by the Brazilian Volleyball Federation that is a member of South American volleyball body Confederación Sudamericana de Voleibol (CSV) and the international volleyball body government the Fédération Internationale de Volleyball (FIVB).

Results

U23 World Championship
 Champions   Runners up   Third place   Fourth place

U22 South America Championship
 Champions   Runners up   Third place   Fourth place

Team

Current squad
The following is the Brazilian roster in the 2017 FIVB Women's U23 World Championship.

Head coach: Wagner Fernandes

Former squads

U23 World Championship
2013 – 7th place
Ellen Braga (c), Mara Leão, Francynne Jacintho, Juliana Carrijo, Larissa Souza, Isabela Paquiardi, Priscila Heldes, Gabriella Souza, Glauciele Silva, Carla Santos, Sonaly Cidrão and Daniela Guimarães
2015 –  Gold medal
Milka Silva, Naiane Rios, Juma Silva, Saraelen Lima, Ana Paula da Cruz, Rosamaria Montibeller (c), Valquiria Dullius, Gabriella Souza, Juliana Fillipelli, Drussyla Costa, Kasiely Clemente and Lorenne Teixeira
2017 – 5th place
Drussyla Costa (c), Bruna Costa, Maira Claro, Gabriela Candido, Lays Freitas, Lyara Medeiros, Ingrid Rizzatti, Lorenne Teixeira, Edinara Brancher, Natália Araujo, Mayany de Souza and Talia Costa

See also
 Brazil men's national under-23 volleyball team
 Brazil women's national volleyball team
 Brazil women's national under-20 volleyball team
 Brazil women's national under-18 volleyball team

References

External links
 Official website 

National women's under-23 volleyball teams
Volleyball in Brazil
Volleyball